The women's 3000 metres race of the 2013–14 ISU Speed Skating World Cup 5, arranged in Eisstadion Inzell, in Inzell, Germany, was held on 8 March 2014.

Ireen Wüst of the Netherlands won, while Martina Sáblíková of the Czech Republic came second, and Yvonne Nauta of the Netherlands came third. Annouk van der Weijden of the Netherlands won the Division B race.

Results
The race took place on Saturday, 8 March, with Division B scheduled in the morning session, at 10:27, and Division A scheduled in the afternoon session, at 14:39.

Division A

Division B

References

Women 3000
5